The Slow Business of Going is a 2000 Greek film directed by Athina Rachel Tsangari. It premiered at the Thessaloniki International Film Festival on 17 November 2000.

Plot
Petra Going (Lizzie Curry Martinez) is a receiver for the Experience Data Agency, which sends her and her fellow receivers out to wander the globe and interact with various characters. The seemingly random interactions are then uploaded into a database where they can later be accessed by users wishing to vicariously inhabit the experiences.

Production
The film was shot over a period of five years, in hotel rooms and other locations in various countries. The script was constantly evolving, with the actors encouraged to improvise and try new things. Tsangari has stated that the making of the film was constantly very playful.

Cast
 Lizzie Curry Martinze as Petra Going
 Maria Tsantsanoglou as Micah
 Gary Price as the gunman
 Kenny Strickland as the tango man

References

External links
 

2000s English-language films